Idrottsklubben Brage, also known as IK Brage or simply Brage, is a Swedish football club located in Borlänge. The club is affiliated with Dalarnas Fotbollförbund and play their home games at Domnarvsvallen. The club colours, reflected in their crest and kit, are green and white. The club can be seen as a continuation of IK Blixt which was founded in the early 1920s but merged into Domnarvets GoIF in 1923. Two years later the merger was split and IK Blixt changed their name to IK Brage, after the Norse god Bragi. The club has played a total of 18 seasons in Allsvenskan, which is the highest level of the Swedish football league system. They currently play in the second highest level (Superettan) where the season lasts from April to November. IK Brage also recently spent time in the third division Division 1 (2014–2017) and fourth division Division 2 between 2005 and 2009) but has mainly played in the two highest Swedish divisions since its foundation.

History

Creation and early rise

In the early 1920s the two Borlänge clubs IK Blixt and Domnarvets GIF merged to form a new club by the name of Domnarvets GoIF. The motive for the merger was to combine their efforts in building the new stadium that would become Domnarvsvallen. The merger did not go smoothly however as the IK Blixt members felt that there needed to be more focus on the football part of the multisport club. This caused them to want to bring back the original IK Blixt but the newly formed Domnarvets GoIF would not allow this since they technically owned the name as IK Blixt was half of the new club. So in 1925 the old IK Blixt members started up a new football club instead and decided in a meeting that the new name would be IK Brage, named after the Norse god Bragi.

After its creation, the club quickly advanced through the divisions until it reached the second highest level after the 1929–1930 season. The club would then go on to have a very successful 1930s which included playing at the highest level for the first time ever in the 1937–38 Allsvenskan. This first golden age culminated in the fourth-place finish two years later but was quickly followed by a relegation followed by a long period of time spent in the second tier.

In early years, in the winter time Brage also fielded teams in bandy.

1970s misery and 1980s success

During the mid-1970s the club had fallen down into the third tier for the first time in nearly 30 years. After spending four straight seasons at such a low level the club brought in Rolf Zetterlund from AIK as their new player manager. During his reign the club advanced quickly through the divisions and made their return to the highest level in the 1980 Allsvenskan where they finished in fourth place, again matching their best ever finish. That same year the club also came close to winning their first major title as they finished runners-up in Svenska Cupen. The success would continue throughout the 1980s as Brage established themselves as an Allsvenskan club. During this period, which is the most successful in club history, Brage finished in the top five three times. This qualified them to compete in the UEFA Cup on several occasions where they played against clubs like Werder Bremen and Inter Milan.

1990s relegation from Allsvenskan

Brage was relegated to the second tier in 1990 and then again in their latest Allsvenskan season in 1993 after having spent the entire year in last place from the first to the last round of the league. After that they have not been able to come back to Allsvenskan.

2000s performance in Superettan and struggling in Division 1 and 2
Things got even worse at the start of the new millennium when the club was relegated first into the third tier but then also into the fourth, a level which the club hadn't played at since its creation in the 1920s. However, they have since bounced back and reestablished themselves in the second tier of swedish football which is from the year 2000 called Superettan.

2010s successful comeback to Superettan and a new level of misery
IK Brage qualified against Qviding in 2009 and was promoted to Superettan for the first time since 2004. Much thanks to great team spirit influenced by the manager Lennart "Kral" Andersson", who was very popuplar among the supporters in Serik Fans. But in 2013 everything collapsed. The new chairman Tommy Andersson and the sports director contracted a lot of experienced but controversial players like Dulee Johnson, Jan Tauer and Njogu Demba Nyrén. Brage only won two games that season and half of the squad left the team before the season was over. The club was relegated to Division 1 once again and was almost in bankruptcy in 2014 and 2015 due to the failed investments in 2013.
In 2019, Brage qualified for promotion playoff against Kalmar FF after a dramatic last game of the season.

Players

First-team squad

Notable players
The following players have received the player of the year award that supporter group "Serik Fans" started giving out in 1996, or are listed as either "club legends" or foreign players with over 50 games at the club on the official Brage website.

 Algot Ström
 Erik Eriksson
 Hugo Zetterberg
 Ingvar "Slana" Österberg
 Tore Åhs
 Stig "Lill-Massa" Johansson
 Sture Lindvall
 Thomas Nilsson
 Rolf Zetterlund
 Nils-Erik "Serik" Johansson
 Bernt Ljung
 Plamen Nikolov
 Simon Hunt
 Göran Arnberg
 Fredrik Söderström
 Jon Persson
 Duško Radinović
 Joel Cedergren
 Martin Ericsson
 Daniel Brandt
 Johan Norell
 Lasse Nilsson
 Mikael Eklund
 Jimmy Rajala
 Jonathan Lundevall
 Niclas Olausson
 Kebba Ceesay
 Jon Åslund
 Pontus Hindrikes
 Johan Eklund
 Gerhard Andersson
 Adam Gradén
 Niklas Sandberg

Managers

 Harry "Dicko" Magnusson (1933)
 József Nagy (1935–42)
 Kristian Henriksen (1942)
 Otto Karlsson (1943–44)
 Erik Eriksson (1943–44)
 Erik Eriksson (1947)
 Sigvard Hjärpe (1948)
 Gösta Eriksson (1951–52)
 Bertil Nordahl (1953–55)
 Gösta Eriksson (1955–57)
 Erik Eriksson (1958–59)
 Holger Hansson (1960)
 Sigvard Hjärpe (1961)
 Lennart Samuelsson (1962–66)
 Bertil Bäckvall (1967–69)
 Imre More (1970)
 Lennart Samuelsson (1971–73)
 Gösta Eriksson (1974)
 Björn Bettner (1975–76)
 Rolf Zetterlund (1977–80)
 Kent Karlsson (1981–82)
 Conny Granqvist (1983)
 Kenneth Rosén (1984–85)
 Jan Mak (1986)
 Håkan Sundin (1987)
 Jan Lindstedt (1988)
 Tommy Lindholm (1989)
 Kjell Pettersson (1990–93)
 Roger Lundin (1994–96)
 Thomas Nilsson (1997)
 Simon Hunt (1998–99)
 Sergei Prigoda (2000–02)
 Roger Lundin (2002)
 Bernt Ljung (2003–04)
 Göran Bergort (2004)
 Lars Ericson (2005–06)
 Björn Lindén (2007)
 Anders Sjöö (2008)
 Johan Hällman (2008)
 Lennart "Kral" Andersson (2009–10)
 Pelle Johansson (2011)
 Lennart "Kral" Andersson (2011)
 Hans Gren (2011)
 Jonas Björkgren (2011)
 Bo Wålemark (2012)
 Örjan Glans (2012)
 Conny Karlsson (2013)
 Zvezdan Milosevic (2013)
 Bo Wålemark (2014)
 Bengt Ottosson (2015–2017)
 Klebér Saarenpää (2018–)

Season to season

* League restructuring in 2006 resulted in a new division being created at Tier 3 and subsequent divisions dropping a level.

Achievements

League
 Division 1 Norra:
Winners (1): 2017
Runners-up (1): 2009
 Division 1 Östra:
 Winners (1): 1992
 Division 2 Norra:
 Winners (6): 1933-34, 1934–35, 1936–37, 1941–42, 1942–43, 1979
Runners-up (4): 1930-31, 1932–33, 1935–36, 1978
 Division 2 Norra Svealand:
 Winners (1): 2007
Runners-up (1):2006
 Division 2 Svealand:
 Winners (3): 1955-56, 1965, 1967
 Division 2 Västra Svealand:
 Winners (1): 2003
 Division 3 Norra:
 Winners (1): 1948-49
 Division 3 Norra Svealand:
 Winners (1): 1972
Runners-up (2):1974, 1975
 Division 3 Uppsvenska:
 Winners (1): 1929-30
 Division 3 Västra Svealand:
 Winners (1): 1977
Runners-up (1):1976

Cups
Svenska Cupen:
Runners-up (1): 1979–80

IK Brage in UEFA competitions

European games

Footnotes
A Current youth players who at least have sat on the bench in a competitive match.

References

External links

IK Brage – official site

 
Football clubs in Dalarna County
Allsvenskan clubs
Sport in Borlänge
Association football clubs established in 1925
Bandy clubs established in 1925
1925 establishments in Sweden
Defunct bandy clubs in Sweden